Norton & Sons is a Savile Row bespoke tailor founded in 1821 by Walter Grant Norton. The firm is located on the east side of the street, at No. 16. It was purchased by Scottish designer Patrick Grant in 2005.

History
In 1859, George James Norton was granted the freedom of the City of London. At about this time, the company became the tailor and Royal Warrant holder to William I, German Emperor. The firm specialised as a sporting tailor.

During the 1970s, the firm absorbed Hoare & Tautz, formed by the merger of E. Tautz & Sons, a sporting tailor, and J. Hoare & Co, a tailor.

In the early 21st century, the company was making fewer than 200 suits per year. It was acquired from the Granger family in 2005 by Patrick Grant, who graduated the same year from Saïd Business School, and his investors. Grant asked Moving Brands to design a "new identity",
and  has "forged links with young British Fashion Designers". Grant also relaunched E. Tautz & Sons as a ready-to-wear label in 2009, for which he was awarded the Menswear Designer of the Year Award at the British Fashion Awards in 2010.

Norton & Sons is a comparatively small outfit, making about 300 bespoke suits a year (the largest probably makes about 1,000 per year) and employing seven tailors and just two cutters.

References

External links
 Official website
 Patrick Grant Interviewed on Vogue TV
 Vanity Fair Holywood Issue 2008
 Kim Jones A/W 07/08

Clothing brands of the United Kingdom
Clothing companies of England
Clothing retailers of England
Shops in London
High fashion brands
Suit makers
Clothing companies based in London
1821 establishments in England
Retail companies established in 1821
British companies established in 1821
Savile Row Bespoke Association members